Cladonia coccifera or madame's cup lichen is a species of fruticose, cup lichen in the family Cladoniaceae. It was first described by Swedish lichenologist Carl Linnaeus in his 1753 work Species Plantarum. German botanist Carl Ludwig Willdenow transferred it to the genus Cladonia in 1787. The base of the thallus comprises rounded squamules (scales) with a yellow to orange-brown undersurface. It typically occurs on acidic peaty and sandy soils.

The lichen has a circumpolar distribution in the Northern Hemisphere, which extends south to the Himalayas.

See also
 List of Cladonia species

References

coccifera
Lichen species
Lichens of Europe
Lichens described in 1753
Taxa named by Carl Linnaeus
Lichens of Asia
Lichens of North America